Hendrik Relve (born 18 July 1948 in Tallinn) is an Estonian environmentalist, nature writer and nature photographer.

In 1971 he graduated from Estonian Agricultural Academy in forest engineering, and in 1989 University of Tartu in journalism.

Since 2002 he is the chief editor of magazine Eesti Mets. He is the host of the Vikerraadio's radio program "Kuula rändajat".

Awards:
 2001: Order of the White Star, IV class.

Filmography
Filmography:
 2006: "Mets seob põlvkondi" (documental film; scenarist)
 2013: "Metsa poole" (documental film; author)
 2014: "Maastiku mustrid" (documental film; script author)	
 2017: "Vaata rändajat" (documental film;, animated film; scenarist, operator, text reader)

References

Living people
1948 births
Estonian male writers
Estonian non-fiction writers
Estonian environmentalists
Estonian photographers
Estonian radio personalities
Recipients of the Order of the White Star, 4th Class
Estonian University of Life Sciences alumni
University of Tartu alumni
People from Tallinn
Writers from Tallinn
Male non-fiction writers
Estonian magazine editors